Sideroxylon anomalum is a species of plant in the family Sapotaceae. It is endemic to the Dominican Republic.

References

anomalum
Vulnerable plants
Endemic flora of the Dominican Republic
Taxonomy articles created by Polbot